Choi Kyu-hah (July 16, 1919 – October 22, 2006), also spelled Choi Kyu-ha or Choi Gyu-ha, was a South Korean politician who served as the fourth president of South Korea from 1979 to 1980.

Early life
Choi was born in Wonju-myeon, Wonju, Gangwon-do (South Korea) in Korea under Japanese rule. Choi was born into a Yangban family; his grandfather had been a scholar at the Sungkyunkwan. During the period of Japanese rule, Choi used the name .

Choi graduated in 1943; two years later he became a professor at the Keijō Normal School.

Political career
Choi served as Ambassador to Malaysia from 1964 to 1967, foreign minister from 1967 to 1971; and as prime minister from 1975 to 1979.

After the assassination of Park Chung-hee in 1979, Choi became acting president; the prime minister stood next in line for the presidency under Article 48 of the Yushin Constitution. Due to the unrest resulting from Park's authoritarian rule, Choi promised democratic elections, as under Park elections had been widely seen as rigged. Choi also promised a new constitution to replace the highly authoritarian Yushin Constitution. Choi was the sole candidate in an election on 6 December for the balance of Park's term, becoming the country's fourth president.

Coup and resignation
In December 1979, Major General Chun Doo-hwan and close allies within the military staged a coup d'état against Choi's government. They quickly removed the army chief of staff and virtually controlled the government by early 1980.

In April 1980, due to increasing pressure from Chun and other politicians, Choi appointed Chun head of the Korean Central Intelligence Agency. In May, Chun declared martial law and dropped all pretense of civilian government, becoming the de facto ruler of the country.  By then, student protests were escalating in Seoul and Gwangju. The protests in Gwangju resulted in the Gwangju uprising in which about 987 civilians were killed within a five-day period by Chun's military.

Choi was forced to resign soon after the uprising. Prime Minister Park Chung-hoon became acting president, until Chun's election as President on September 1, 1980.

Later life
After his resignation, Choi lived quietly out of the public eye and died on October 22, 2006. His funeral was held on October 26, 2006, and was attended by President Roh Moo-hyun, first lady Kwon Yang-sook, Prime Minister Han Myeong-sook, former presidents Chun Doo-hwan, Kim Young-sam and Kim Dae-jung. Choi was buried in Daejeon National Cemetery.

See also
 Gangneung Choi clan

References

External links
 President Choi Kyu-ha

 
Presidents of South Korea
Acting presidents of South Korea
1919 births
2006 deaths
Liberal Party (South Korea) politicians
University of Tsukuba alumni
Foreign ministers of South Korea
People from Wonju
20th-century South Korean politicians
South Korean Confucianists